The 2005 CONCACAF U-20 Tournament was an eight nation competition arranged to decide which four nations were to qualify for the 2005 FIFA U-20 World Cup.

Each team registered 18 players.

Group A

Costa Rica

Head coach:  Carlos Watson

Panama

Head coach:  Victor René Mendieta

Trinidad and Tobago

Head coach:  Anton Corneal

United States

Head coach:  Sigi Schmid

Group B

Canada

Head coach:  Dale Mitchell

Honduras

Head coach:  Rubén Guifarro

Jamaica

Head coach:  Wendell Downswell

Mexico

Head coach:  Humberto Grondona

References

CONCACAF Under-20 Championship squads